Tatar State University of Humanities and Education is a university in Kazan, Russian Federation. It was formed in 2005 by a merger of several institutions, some which had a particular focus on the use of Tatar as a medium of instruction or the study of the language itself, for example the Kazan State Pedagogical University and Tatar State Humanities Institute (the latter created in 1996 with the purpose of expanding Tatar-language higher education). The university is considered a successor to Kazan State Pedagogical University, the third oldest pedagogical university in Russia, after Moscow State Pedagogical University and Hertzen Russian State Pedagogical University in Saint Petersburg.

About
The university was founded as the Kazan Teachers Institute, on October 24, 1876 in Kazan, Russia, with the goal of preparing teachers for work in city high schools. In the wake of the Russian Revolution, it was reorganized as the Kazan Teachers Institute in 1918. It was subsequently renamed Eastern Pedagogical Institute (1922), Tatar Pedagogical Institute (1931), Kazan State Pedagogical Institute (1934), and Kazan State Pedagogical University (1994). Over its history, the university's structure, role, and name have changed with the vagaries of nationalities policy, but it maintained its status as the region's leading institution for teaching. In 2005, the Tatar State Humanities University, Tatar-American Regional Institute, and Kazan State Pedagogical University merged, forming the present Tatar State University of Humanities and Education.

The 2005 merger created four new faculties, bringing the total to sixteen, with 28 majors and a total enrollment of more than 15,000 students. In accordance with the Republic of Tatarstan's language policies and the university's role in Tatar education, some faculties offer lectures and coursework in both Russian and Tatar. Part of the fourth year of undergraduate study is an internship in the field of study, often including student teaching.

References

Educational institutions established in 1876
Universities in Kazan
1876 establishments in the Russian Empire